The Wilkins-Bernal-Medawar Lecture is a public lecture organised annually by the Royal Society of London.

It was formed in 2005 by the merger of the Wilkins Lecture, the Bernal Lecture and the Medawar Lecture. The subject matter for the lecture is some aspect of the social function of science as per the Bernal Lecture, the philosophy of science as per the Medawar Lecture or the history of science as per the Wilkins Lecture.

List of lecturers

References 

Royal Society lecture series
Annual events in the United Kingdom
2005 establishments in the United Kingdom
Recurring events established in 2005